The Department of Main Roads may be the tile of the following organisations:

Department of Main Roads (New South Wales)
Department of Main Roads (Queensland)
Main Roads Western Australia, formerly the Main Roads Department